Sri Lanka participated in the 2010 Asian Para Games–First Asian Para Games in Guangzhou, China from 13 to 19 December 2010. Athletes from Sri Lanka won total nine medals (including one gold), and finished at the 17th spot in a medal table.

References

Nations at the 2010 Asian Para Games
2010 in Sri Lankan sport
Sri Lanka at the Asian Para Games